Becskeháza is a village in Borsod-Abaúj-Zemplén county, Hungary.

In 1840, Only nine Jews lived in the village. However, the number grew a little bit to 50–200 by the 19th and 20th centuries.

The village has a Jewish cemetery.

References

External links 
 Street map 

Populated places in Borsod-Abaúj-Zemplén County